The 4th FINA World Junior Swimming Championships, were held on August 26–31, 2013, in Dubai, United Arab Emirates.

Medal table

Medal summary

Boys' events

Girls' events

Mixed events

External links
 Official site
 Event Information
 Official results

FINA World Junior Swimming Championships
Sports competitions in Dubai
Swimming competitions in the United Arab Emirates
S
S
J